Savery Pond is a  pond in Ellisville section of Plymouth, Massachusetts, in the Eastland Heights neighborhood, approximately  from Route 3A off Old Sandwich Road. Indian Head Campground maintains a beach along the southern shore of the pond.

External links
Environmental Protection Agency
South Shore Coastal Watersheds - Lake Assessments
Savery Pond Website - Friends of Ellisville Marsh

Ponds of Plymouth, Massachusetts
Ponds of Massachusetts